Woodwardia prolifera (Chinese: 珠芽狗脊) is a species of fern in the family Blechnaceae.They can be found in China, Japan and the Himalayas. It was first described by Sir William Jackson Hooker and Walker Arnott in 1838.

Distribution 
This species can be found growing around coastal locations, mountain slopes and near streams. They usually occur in wet conditions at elevations between 100 – 1,100m.

Description 
Their fronds are between 1.5 – 3m in length and can vary in colour from green to orange. They have pink-orange plantlets. These evergreen plants usually grow in chalky, acidic soil under light shade.

They are also a diploid species. Their spores are between 75 – 78 microns long and their guard cells are between 35 – 51 microns long.

Taxonomy 
This species is known by the names W. orientalis var. prolifera or var. formosana. Although its possible to visually distinguish, they are closely related to and are sometimes confused with Woodwardia orientalis.

Cultivation 
This species is a popular plant in horticulture. It has gained the Royal Horticultural Society's Award of Garden Merit.

They can be propagated by pegging down their fronds and then letting the plantlets or bulbils create roots before removing them from the frond. The bulbils or plantlets can also be planted separately although high humidity is required. They can also be easily propagated with spores.

Chemistry 
Three different lignans, blechnic acid, 7-epiblechnic acid, and brainic acid are known to be present in Woodwardia prolifera.

See also 
 Woodwardia unigemmata – another closely related species
 Flora of Japan
 Plant propagation

References

Further reading 
 A Checklist for the South China Botanical Garden, Guangzhou, Guangdong Province, P. R. China
 Chinese Plant Names
 Flora of Taiwan Checklist

Flora of China
Flora of Japan
Blechnaceae